The France 4 Visionary Award is an independent film award given by France 4 at the Cannes Film Festival to reflect "the cinephile's passion and enthusiasm for new talent in the film industry". It was founded in 2012 and is given to one out of the seven feature films in Competition at the International Critics' Week section.

Award winners

References

External links 
 International Critics' Week Official website
 Official webpage of the Cannes Film Festival

Cannes Film Festival
Lists of films by award